Aniara may refer to:

Biology
 Aniara, a genus of tiger beetles, containing only one species, Aniara sepulchralis
 Scopula aniara, a moth of the family Geometridae
 Adoxophyes aniara, a moth of the family Tortricidae

Other uses
Aniara, a poem by Swedish Nobel laureate Harry Martinson
 Aniara (opera), by Karl-Birger Blomdahl
 Aniara (film), based on the poem

See also
 Anniara Muñoz (born 1980), Cuban volleyball player